The 1986–87 North Dakota Fighting Sioux men's ice hockey team represented the University of North Dakota in college ice hockey. In its 9th year under head coach John Gasparini the team compiled a 40–8–0 record and reached the NCAA tournament for the eleventh time. The Fighting Sioux defeated defending champion Michigan State 5–3 to win the championship game at the Joe Louis Arena in Detroit, Michigan.

Season

Early season
After a rather dismal season, North Dakota was expected to improve but not challenge for the WCHA title in 1987. The team, however, received a major boon from two players that changed their fortune. The first was from freshman goaltender Ed Belfour, a 21-year old player who had spent the past three years in relative obscurity in the Manitoba Junior Hockey League. The second was from returning sophomore Tony Hrkac who had produced well in his first campaign but spent the entire 1985-86 season with the Canadian National Team.

The two players were instrumental in Gino Gasparini's team getting off to a fast start, winning its first 8 games and jumping out to a huge lead in the conference standings. While Belfour was establishing himself in net as one of the top players in the country, Hrkac was on an all-time scoring pace, flanked by Bob Joyce and Steve Johnson. The Fighting Sioux split a pair of weekends on the road but they used their indomitable home crowd to their advantage and finished the month of November with a 14–2 record (13–2 in conference).

December slump
North Dakota began December with another road split and followed that with their first home loss of the year, losing to a middling US International squad. Though they recovered slightly in the second game of the weekend the team lost both games of its holiday weekend in New England. Having lost four of their previous five games and producing some of their worst performances of the season, it appeared that the Fighting Sioux might be sliding back to the pack but a 4-game stretch at home came at the perfect time.

Winning streak
UND hosted the two Boston schools at the beginning of January and took both games, dispelling any doubts about their ability to compete with Eastern teams, then welcomed in WCHA powerhouse Minnesota. The defense returned in force, holding the Gophers to two goals in each game and allowing Hrkac to lead the Sioux to consecutive wins and seat North Dakota atop the conference standings.

The Fighting Sioux continued their winning streak for another five weeks, taking 14 matches before their next loss which came on the final weekend of the regular season. UND finished with a record of 31–7 and won the WCHA handily, ending 7 points above Minnesota.

WCHA tournament
As the top seed, North Dakota would be able to play each round of the conference tournament at home. They faced Minnesota–Duluth in the quarters, easily dispatching the Bulldogs in both games. Next up was Colorado College who had upset in-state rival Denver. The Tigers fell 6–2 in the first game and the 4-goal advantage allowed the Fighting Sioux to get away with a sloppy effort in the rematch; CC won the second game but only by a single goal and North Dakota advanced to the championship with a 7–4 series win.

North Dakota met Minnesota once more in the finals and again, despite possessing one of the top offenses in the country, couldn't get much past the Fighting Sioux defense. UND won both games by a 5–3 score and won the WCHA championship, their first in 7 years. The 36 wins they had at that point set a new program record while Tony Hrkac finished with 104 points, just 6 points away from a new NCAA record.

NCAA tournament
North Dakota received the top western seed, and played another home series, this time against ECAC Hockey runner-Up St. Lawrence. UND won both games to take the total-goal series 9–4 with Hrkac piling up the points (2 goals and 5 assists), breaking Bill Watson's record for points in a season with two games yet to play. Additionally, the Fighting Sioux tied the NCAA record for wins in a season with 38 (Michigan State, 1985).

UND met 1986 Runner-Up Harvard in the semifinal at the Joe Louis Arena. Once again Hrkac was the story of the game, scoring a goal and adding three assists as the Fighting Sioux trounced the Crimson 5–2 to reach the championship. On defending National Champion Michigan State stood in their way but just as they had against Harvard, UND got off to a quick start; this time with was Ian Kidd who led the way with a goal and two assists in the first period. North Dakota built a 3–0 lead after 20 minutes while allowed only 2 shots from the Spartans to reach Ed Belfour. MSU woke up in the second period, scoring twice on 8 shots, but the Sioux added another goal of their own as well as a fifth goal in the third to hold off Michigan State. The Spartans eventually scored their third of the game but it came too late to mount a comeback and North Dakota won their fifth national championship.

Awards and honors
Tony Hrkac scored 12 points in four tournament games, the second-highest total ever (behind the 13 points by both Aaron Broten (1981) and Tony Amonte (1990) as of 2019) and was awarded the tournament MOP despite scoring only once in the championship match. He was joined on the All-Tournament team by Ed Belfour, Ian Kidd and Bob Joyce. Just prior to the championship game Hrkac received the Hobey Baker Award as the top Division I athlete and finished the season as the first North Dakota player to lead the NCAA in scoring. Hrkac's 116 points in an NCAA record for a single season and is 7 better than the next-highest total (as of 2019). Head coach Gino Gasparini, for leading his team to the first-ever 40-win season, was awarded the Spencer Penrose Award as the top Division I coach, also a first for North Dakota. Hrkac, Joyce and Kidd were also named to the AHCA All-American West first-team, while Belfour was a second-team All-American.

All four players were also on the All-WCHA First Team with Hrkac being named as the conference Most Valuable Player and Gasparini as the Coach of the Year for the third time.

Both Ed Belfour and Tony Hrkac left the program after the season to begin their professional careers. Hrkac played a long time in the NHL, amassing 371 over 758 games while Belfour finished his career with the then-3rd-most wins in NHL history (484) and was elected to the Hockey Hall of Fame in 2011.

Standings

Schedule

|-
!colspan=12 style=";" | Regular Season

|-
!colspan=12 style=";" | 

|- align="center" bgcolor="#e0e0e0"
|colspan=12|North Dakota Won Series 13-4

|- align="center" bgcolor="#e0e0e0"
|colspan=12|North Dakota Won Series 7-4

|- align="center" bgcolor="#e0e0e0"
|colspan=12|North Dakota Won Series 10-6
|-
!colspan=12 style=";" | 

|- align="center" bgcolor="#e0e0e0"
|colspan=12|North Dakota Won Series 7-2

† All scheduled games between WCHA and Hockey East teams in the regular season were counted in the standings for both conferences.

Roster and scoring statistics

Goaltending statistics

1987 championship game

(W1) North Dakota vs. (W2) Michigan State

Players drafted into the NHL

1987 NHL Entry Draft

† incoming freshman

1987 NHL Supplemental Draft

See also
1987 NCAA Division I Men's Ice Hockey Tournament
List of NCAA Division I Men's Ice Hockey Tournament champions

References

North Dakota Fighting Hawks men's ice hockey seasons
North Dakota
North Dakota
North Dakota
North Dakota
North Dakota
North Dakota